Drury University, formerly Drury College and originally Springfield College, is a private university in Springfield, Missouri. The university's mission statement describes itself as "church-related". It enrolls about 1,700 undergraduate and graduate students in six master's programs and 1,279 students in the College of Continuing Professional Studies.
In 2013, the Drury Panthers men's basketball team won the NCAA Men's Division II Basketball Championship. The Drury men's and women's Panthers have accumulated 22 NCAA Division II National Championships between them, in addition to numerous NAIA titles before moving to the NCAA.

History
Drury was founded as Springfield College in 1873 by Congregationalist church missionaries in the mold of other Congregationalist universities such as Dartmouth College and Yale University. Nathan Morrison, Samuel Drury, and James and Charles Harwood provided the school's initial endowment and organization; Samuel Drury's gift was the largest of the group and the school was soon renamed as Drury College in honor of Drury's recently deceased son on December 10, 1874.

The early curriculum emphasized educational, religious, and musical strengths. Students came to the new college from a wide area including the Indian Territories of Oklahoma. The first graduating class included four women.

Twenty-five years later the  campus included Stone Chapel, the President's House and three academic buildings. Today, the university occupies a  campus, including the original historic buildings.
On April 28, 1960, Drury College was the setting for an episode of NBC's The Ford Show, Starring Tennessee Ernie Ford. Tennessee Ernie Ford sang his trademark "Sixteen Tons" and the hymn "Take My Hand, Precious Lord".

Drury College became Drury University on January 1, 2000.

The current president is J. Timothy Cloyd, formerly president of Hendrix College in Conway, Arkansas. Cloyd was elected to serve as the 18th president of Drury University in 2016.

Religious affiliations
Drury, like Dartmouth and Yale, was founded by Congregationalist missionaries. It remains affiliated with the Congregationalist church and its successor, the United Church of Christ. It has also been affiliated with the Christian Church (Disciples of Christ) since the founding of the Drury School of Religion in 1909.

Academics
Drury is accredited by the Higher Learning Commission. The university offers 54 undergraduate majors and several professional degrees through the Hammons School of Architecture, Breech School of Business Administration, and School of Education & Child Development.

Drury is a residential university. Full-time day school students live on campus until they are a minimum age of 21 at the start of an academic year, unless they meet specific criteria to be exempt from the housing policy. First-year student live in one of the three residence halls: Smith, Wallace, and Sunderland halls. Upperclassmen may choose to live in university-owned apartments, houses, fraternity houses, or the Summit Park Leadership Community.

Study abroad
Drury's study abroad program is an integral part of the college experience. Almost half of the student body studies overseas at some point in short-term, semester, or year-long programs. Foreign learning is a requirement for most students with majors in the schools of Business and Architecture.

Drury also maintained a satellite campus in Aegina, Greece that was home to several of the university's most distinctive courses. The center is scheduled to close by May 2021.

Athletics

Drury's NCAA Division II intercollegiate athletic teams compete in men's and women's basketball, men's and women's cross country, men's and women's Track and Field, men's and women's golf, men's and women's soccer, men's and women's swimming, men's and women's tennis, men's baseball, men's wrestling, women's softball, women's volleyball, men's bowling, and women's bowling, women's triathlon and soon to be men's triathlon.

The school was a founding member of the Heartland Conference. In the fall of 2005, the Drury Panthers joined the Great Lakes Valley Conference

Greek organizations
Drury currently has four sororities and four fraternities.

Sororities:
 Delta Delta Delta
 Kappa Delta
 Pi Beta Phi
 Zeta Tau Alpha

Fraternities:
 Sigma Nu
 Kappa Alpha Order
 Sigma Pi
 Lambda Chi Alpha

Notable alumni
 Bob Barker, former game show host and executive producer of The Price Is Right
 Ernest R. Breech, chairman of Ford Motor Company and Trans World Airlines
 Charles H. Brown, member of the United States House of Representatives from 1957 to 1961
 Mike Carter (born 1955), American-Israeli basketball player
 David Clohessy, director of Survivors Network of those Abused by Priests (SNAP)
 David Crabtree, film critic and celebrity blogger
 Robert Cummings, film and television actor
 Danny Dark, voiceover for TV commercials as well as the voice of Superman in the Super Friends TV series
 Bob Dixon, former member of the Missouri Senate and current Greene County, Missouri Presiding Commissioner
 David Kershenbaum, iconic platinum record producer and record company executive - Hollywood California
 Dan Glass, former president of Kansas City Royals
 Dabbs Greer, actor
 Durward Hall, member of the United States House of Representatives from 1961 to 1973
 Frederic Aldin Hall, chancellor of Washington University in St. Louis from 1913 to 1923
 Lauren Holtkamp, NBA referee
 Mary Ellen Hopkins, quilter and author
 Edna Kenton, feminist writer
 Drew Kifer, Actor, Clorox commercials
 J. Paul Leonard (1901–1995), American university president, educator
 Michael Mallory, author and journalist
 Miranda Maverick, MMA Flyweight fighter in the UFC and formerly Invicta Fighting Championships
 Susan Montee, State Auditor of Missouri
 John Morris, founder and majority owner of Bass Pro Shops
 Larry O'Reilly, Rosalie O'Reilly Wooten, & David O'Reilly, founders of O'Reilly Auto Parts
 Ismael Ortiz, Panamanian swimmer
 Todd Parnell, banker and former president of Drury University
 Trevor Richards, Major League Baseball pitcher for the Toronto Blue Jays
 Jeanie Riddle, Republican member of the Missouri Senate
 James Edward Ruffin, member of the United States House of Representatives from 1933 to 1935
 Si Siman, music industry executive
 Heidi Strobel, Survivor: The Amazon contestant
 David E. Sweet, founding president of Metropolitan State University and later president of Rhode Island College
 Bill Virdon, professional baseball player and manager 
 Tom Whitlock, songwriter and lyricist best known for his Academy Award and Golden Globe winning song Take My Breath Away
 John William Yettaw, The Suu Kyi swimmer

References

External links

 
 Drury Athletics website

 
Universities and colleges affiliated with the Christian Church (Disciples of Christ)
Universities and colleges affiliated with the United Church of Christ
Universities and colleges in Springfield, Missouri
Educational institutions established in 1873
1873 establishments in Missouri
Private universities and colleges in Missouri